Epitonium tenellum, common name the small wentletrap,  is a species of small ectoparasitic sea snail, a marine gastropod mollusk in the family Epitoniidae, the wentletraps.

Distribution
This snail is found in shallow water in southeastern Australia and the North Island of New Zealand.

Description
The shell height varies between 10 mm and 20mm

References

 Powell A W B, New Zealand Mollusca, William Collins Publishers Ltd, Auckland, New Zealand 1979 

Epitoniidae
Gastropods of Australia
Gastropods of New Zealand
Gastropods described in 1885